Jordi César López Delgado (born 27 March 1992), known as Jordi César, is a Spanish footballer who plays for CF Gandía as a centre-back or a left-back.

Club career
Jordi César was born in Alicante from Uruguayan ancestors, his great-grandfather Juan Delgado having played for Peñarol. He played youth football for five clubs including Hércules CF, Real Madrid and Real Valladolid, making his senior debut with the latter's B team in the 2011–12 season in the Tercera División; on 8 September 2011, he appeared in his first official game with the main squad courtesy of manager Miroslav Đukić, coming on as a late substitute in a 6–0 home win against Gimnàstic de Tarragona in the second round of the Copa del Rey.

In the summer of 2012, Jordi César returned to Hércules, initially being assigned to the reserves in the regional championships. On 2 December 2012 he played his first match in the Segunda División, at SD Huesca (45 minutes, 1–1 draw, providing the assist for Javier Portillo's late equaliser), as coach Quique Hernández had lost both left-backs – Paco Peña and Pepe Sellés – to injury.

Jordi César all but competed in the Segunda División B the following years, with Atlético Levante UD, Cultural y Deportiva Leonesa, CF Gavà and AD Unión Adarve. Abroad, he had spells at FC Winterthur in the Swiss Challenge League and Nea Salamis Famagusta FC of the Cypriot First Division.

Honours
Valladolid B
Tercera División: 2011–12

References

External links

1992 births
Living people
Spanish people of Uruguayan descent
Spanish footballers
Footballers from Alicante
Association football defenders
Segunda División players
Segunda División B players
Tercera División players
Tercera Federación players
Divisiones Regionales de Fútbol players
Real Valladolid Promesas players
Real Valladolid players
Hércules CF B players
Hércules CF players
Atlético Levante UD players
Levante UD footballers
Cultural Leonesa footballers
CF Gavà players
CD Lealtad players
Orihuela CF players
UB Conquense footballers
CF Gandía players
Swiss Challenge League players
FC Winterthur players
Cypriot First Division players
Nea Salamis Famagusta FC players
Spanish expatriate footballers
Expatriate footballers in Switzerland
Expatriate footballers in Cyprus
Spanish expatriate sportspeople in Switzerland
Spanish expatriate sportspeople in Cyprus